Hemis-Shukpachan or Hemishok Pachan is a village in the Leh district of Ladakh, India. It is located in the Likir tehsil. Alternative transliterations of the village's name include Hemmis Shyk Pachan and Hemis Shukpachan.

Demographics
According to the 2011 census of India, Hemis Shukpachan has 144 households. The effective literacy rate (i.e. the literacy rate of population excluding children aged 6 and below) is 65.62%.

References 

Villages in Likir tehsil